Stephen Leslie Reed (born 18 June 1985) is an English footballer who plays for Barnstaple Town.

Career
Reed was born in Barnstaple, Devon and began his career as a trainee with Yeovil Town, turning professional in September 2002. He made his Conference debut in April 2003, as a substitute in a 4–0 away win against Dagenham & Redbridge, his only appearance as Yeovil won promotion to the Football League. His league debut came in November 2003, Reed was sent off late in the game as Yeovil lost 2–1 to Bury, Bury's winner coming just two minutes after Reed's dismissal.

In October 2004, Reed joined Forest Green Rovers on loan, spending two months with the Nailsworth side. Further loan spells followed the next season, in August 2005 with Woking and the following month with Aldershot Town. In March 2006 he joined Torquay United on loan, moving to Plainmoor on a free transfer at the end of the season.

Reed left Torquay by mutual consent on 16 February 2007, joining Tiverton Town the same day. He later joined Weston-super-Mare until the end of the season. On 17 May 2007, Reed signed for Conference National side Cambridge United.

In July 2008, he joined Weymouth. He left the club on 23 April 2009 due to an "internal club matter." but joined Macclesfield Town on 21 May 2009. He joined Conference National club, Grays Athletic on a one-month loan in November 2009. In December 2009, Reed joined his former club Weymouth on a one-month loan to get match fitness, a deal which was extended on 16 January 2010, until the end of the 2009–10 season.

He was released by the club, along with 10 other players at the end of the 2009–10 season.

In the summer of 2013 he rejoined Tiverton Town. He then joined Bideford in October 2013.

References

External links

1985 births
Living people
English footballers
Sportspeople from Barnstaple
Yeovil Town F.C. players
Forest Green Rovers F.C. players
Woking F.C. players
Aldershot Town F.C. players
Torquay United F.C. players
Tiverton Town F.C. players
Weston-super-Mare A.F.C. players
Cambridge United F.C. players
Weymouth F.C. players
Macclesfield Town F.C. players
Grays Athletic F.C. players
Chelmsford City F.C. players
Bideford A.F.C. players
Ilfracombe Town F.C. players
Holsworthy A.F.C. players
English Football League players
National League (English football) players
Association football midfielders